The 1994–95 FIBA European Cup was the twenty-ninth edition of FIBA's 2nd-tier level European-wide professional club basketball competition. It occurred between September 6, 1994, and March 14, 1995. The final was held at the Abdi İpekçi Arena, Istanbul, Turkey. Benetton Treviso defeated Taugrés, in front of 6,000 spectators.

First round

|}

Second round

|}

Third round
Wild card to participate in the European Cup for the Loser clubs* of the 1/16 finals of the 1994–95 FIBA European League.
*Thames Valley Tigers, Croatia Osiguranje, Budivelnyk, Žalgiris, Olympique Antibes, Bioveta Brno, Hapoel Tel Aviv, Danone Honvéd, Maes Flandria, Fidefinanz Bellinzona, Kärcher Hisings-Kärra, Pezoporikos Larnaca, ASK Brocēni and Baník Cígeľ Prievidza.

|}

Quarterfinals group stage

Semifinals
Seeded teams played games 2 and 3 at home.

|}

Final
March 14, Abdi İpekçi Arena, Istanbul

|}

References

External links
1994–95 FIBA European Cup @ FIBA Europe.com
1994–95 FIBA European Cup at Linguasport

FIBA
1994-95